Jessica Dobson (born 1984) is an American singer and multi-instrumentalist. She has performed with several musicians and bands, including Beck, Conor Oberst, Spoon, Yeah Yeah Yeahs, and American indie rock band The Shins, as well as being a solo artist. She is currently fronting and playing guitar for her own band, Deep Sea Diver.

Career
Born in Los Angeles, California, Dobson was signed to Atlantic Records when she was 19 years old. She recorded two solo albums under her own name while on the label, but she was not satisfied with either of the finished products and Atlantic ultimately shelved both albums.

Deep Sea Diver

After leaving Atlantic, Dobson recorded an EP called New Caves under the name Deep Sea Diver. She later formed a band under the Deep Sea Diver name consisting of herself on guitar, John Raines on bass and Peter Mansen on drums. The band’s full-length debut album, History Speaks, was self-released in February 2012. In September 2019, she began touring with Joseph in support of Deep Sea Diver's forthcoming third full-length record.

The Shins
In August 2011, it was announced that Dobson would be performing with American indie rock band The Shins. She toured with the band throughout October, and she became an official member of the band in February 2012. Due to her desire to spend more time on writing and performing her own music, she departed from The Shins in 2013.

Beck
It was announced that Dobson would perform with indie/alternative musician Beck on his Modern Guilt tour from 2008–2009.

Personal life
Dobson is married to Peter Mansen, who is the drummer of Deep Sea Diver. They met when he was working as a barista at the Lighthouse Roasters coffee house in Seattle. Dobson is a Christian and includes spiritual themes in her music.

Discography

With Deep Sea Diver
New Caves EP (2009)
History Speaks (2012)
Always Waiting EP (2014)Secrets (2016)Impossible Weight'' (2020)

References

External links

1984 births
American women drummers
American women guitarists
American rock bass guitarists
American rock drummers
American rock pianists
Women bass guitarists
Living people
American performers of Christian music
Atlantic Records artists
21st-century American bass guitarists
Guitarists from Los Angeles
21st-century American drummers
The Shins members
21st-century American women pianists
21st-century American pianists